Asahi Kurizuka (born May 9, 1937) is a Japanese actor. He made his film debut with "Bukinaki Tatakai" directed by Satsuo Yamamoto in 1960. In 1966, he received the Elan d'or Award for Newcomer of the Year. He specializes in jidaigeki . Especially he is famous for playing the role of Hijikata Toshizō, he portrayed the role multiple times. His most notable appearances include the following:

Filmography

Film
 Bukinaki Tatakai (1960)
 Onna no Issho (1967), Ogi Soichi
 Moeyo Ken (1966), Hijikata Toshizō
 Harbor Light Yokohama (1968)
 Futari Biyori (2005), Kuroda Gen
 Shundo (2013), Nishizaki
 Ninja Kids : Summer Mission Impossible (2013)
 Chambara: The Art of Japanese Swordplay (2015)
 The Old Capital (2016)
 Love's Twisting Path (2019), Monk
 Musicophilia (2021)

Television
 Shinsengumi Keppūroku (1965), Hijikata Toshizō
 Warera Kyūnin no Senki (1966)
 Ore wa Yōjinbō (1967)
 Kaze, co-starring Sanae Tsuchida (1967)
 Moeyo Ken (1970), Hijikata Toshizō
 Shinsengumi (1973), Hijikata Toshizō
 Inochi Moyu (1981), Hijikata Toshizō
 Shinsengumi! (2004), Hijikata Tamejirō
 Abarenbo Shogun (xxxx) (as semi-regular character Yamada Asaemon)

References

External links
 

1937 births
Living people
Japanese male actors